Kartick Bose (6 August 1906 – 3 July 1984) was an Indian cricketer. He played 44 first-class matches for Bengal between 1930 and 1952.

See also
 List of Bengal cricketers

References

External links
 

1906 births
1984 deaths
Indian cricketers
Bengal cricketers
Cricketers from Kolkata